
The Public Theater has produced over 100 plays and musicals at the Delacorte Theater in New York City's Central Park since the theater's opening in 1962. Currently the series is produced under the brand Free Shakespeare in the Park, and all productions are staged at the Delacorte. In past decades, the series was branded The New York Shakespeare Festival and encompassed productions at both the Delacorte and the Public's downtown location in the former Astor Library.

Henry VIII, staged in 1997, was celebrated as the final work of the Shakespearean canon to be performed as part of the series, but within productions staged at the Delacorte, Macbeth was not performed until 2006 and, the three parts of Henry VI have not been performed except as the heavily adapted Wars of the Roses in 1970.

With the 2022 season, As You Like It joined Measure for Measure, Twelfth Night, and Much Ado About Nothing as the most-performed works, each having been produced six times (including musical adaptations).

Productions before the Delacorte
All plays are by William Shakespeare. Except as noted, all productions were staged in Central Park on or adjacent to the site of the future Delacorte Theater.

Productions at the Delacorte

All plays are by William Shakespeare unless otherwise noted.

Notes on works performed

Notes on productions

References

Shakespeare festivals in the United States
Central Park
Theatre in New York City